Baytimirovo (Baytimer) is a rural locality (a village) in Urshakbashkaramalinsky Selsoviet, Miyakinsky District, Bashkortostan, Russia. The population was 140 as of 2010. There are 2 streets.

Geography 
Baytimirovo is located 25 km southeast of Kirgiz-Miyaki (the district's administrative centre) by road. Uyazybashevo is the nearest rural locality.

References 

Rural localities in Miyakinsky District